Living with AIDS is a 1987 documentary film directed by Tina Di Feliciantonio that achieved some recognition and awards within the film industry and earned Di Feliciantonio an Emmy. Part of the AIDS Film Project, it was one of the first films broadcast on PBS about AIDS when it premiered on July 19, 1988. The film tells the story of Todd Coleman and the people who cared for him during his final weeks.

Coleman moved from Denver to San Francisco at the age of 16 and was diagnosed with AIDS at 21. DiFeliciantonio was a graduate student at Stanford and decided to film his care as a way of showing the world another side of the AIDS epidemic.

References

External links

1987 films
1987 documentary films
HIV/AIDS in American films
Documentary films about HIV/AIDS
American LGBT-related animated television series
1987 LGBT-related films
1980s American films